Fuegians are the indigenous inhabitants of Tierra del Fuego, at the southern tip of South America. In English, the term originally referred to the Yaghan people of Tierra del Fuego. In Spanish, the term fueguino can refer to any person from the archipelago.

The indigenous Fuegians belonged to several different tribes including the Ona (Selk'nam), Haush (Manek'enk), Yaghan (Yámana), and Alacaluf (Kawésqar). All of these tribes except the Selk'nam lived exclusively in coastal areas and have their own languages. The Yaghans and the Alacaluf traveled by birchbark canoes around the islands of the archipelago, while the coast dwelling Haush did not.  The Selk'nam lived in the interior of Isla Grande de Tierra del Fuego and lived mainly by hunting guanacos. The Ona were exclusively terrestrial hunter gatherers that hunted terrestrial game such as guanacos, foxes, tuco-tucos and upland nesting birds as well as littoral fish and shellfish. The Fuegian peoples spoke several distinct languages: both the Kawésqar language and the Yaghan language are considered language isolates, while the Selk'nams spoke a Chon language like the Tehuelches on the mainland.

European contact

When Chileans and Argentines of European descent studied, invaded and settled on the islands in the mid-19th century, they brought with them diseases such as measles and smallpox for which the Fuegians had no immunity. The Fuegian population was devastated by the diseases, and their numbers were reduced from several thousand in the 19th century to hundreds in the 20th century. In 1876 a serious smallpox epidemic decimated the Fuegians. Between 1881 and 1883 the Yahgan population dropped from perhaps 3,000 to only 1,000 due to measles and smallpox.

As early as 1878 Europeans in Punta Arenas seeking additional sheep pastures negotiated to acquire large tracts of land on Isla Grande de Tierra del Fuego from the Chilean government just prior to Argentina and Chile's sovereignty here.

By 1876, Christian missionaries claimed to have converted the entire Yamana people.

On May 11, 1830 several Fuegians (Alacaluf) were transported to England by the schooner Allen Gardiner, presented to the court, and resided there for a number of years before three were returned.

The United States Exploring Expedition came in contact with the Fuegians in 1839.  One member of the expedition called the Fuegians the "greatest mimics I ever saw."

European genocide
The Selk'nam genocide was authorized and conducted by the estancieros that between 1884–1900 resulted in a severe indigenous population decline. Large companies paid sheep farmers or militia a bounty for each Selk'nam dead, which was confirmed on presentation of a pair of hands or ears, or later a complete skull. They were given more for the death of a woman than a man.

Material culture 

"Archaeological investigations show the prevalence of maritime hunter-gatherer organization throughout the occupation of the region (6400 BP – 19th century)." Although the Fuegians were all hunter-gatherers, their material culture was not homogeneous: the big island and the archipelago made two different adaptations possible.  Some of the cultures were coast-dwelling, while others were land-oriented. Neither was restricted to Tierra del Fuego:
 The coast provided fish, sea birds, otters, seals, shellfish in winter and sometimes also whales. Yaghans got their sustenance this way. Alacalufs (living in the Strait of Magellan and some islands), and Chonos (living further to the north, on Chilean coasts and archipelagos) were similar. Most whales were stranded but some whaling occurred. 
 Selk'nams lived on the inland plain of the big island of Tierra del Fuego, communally hunting herds of guanaco. The material culture had some similarities to that of the (also linguistically related) Tehuelches living outside Tierra del Fuego in the southern plains of Argentina.

All Fuegian tribes had a nomadic lifestyle, and lacked permanent shelters.  The guanaco-hunting Selk'nam made their huts out of stakes, dry sticks, and leather.  They broke camp and carried their things with them, and wandered following the hunting and gathering possibilities.  The coastal Yamana and Alacaluf also changed their camping places, traveling by birchbark canoes.

Spiritual culture

Mythology 

There are some correspondences or putative borrowings between the Yámana and Selk'nam mythologies.
The hummingbird was an animal revered by the Yámanas, and the Taiyin creation myth explaining the creation of the archipelago's water system, the culture hero "Taiyin" is portrayed in the guise of a hummingbird. A Yámana myth, "The egoist fox", features a hummingbird as a helper and has some similarities to the Taiyin-myth of the Selk'nam. Similar remarks apply to the myth about the big albatross: it shares identical variants for both tribes. Some examples of myths having shared or similar versions in both tribes:
 the myth about a sea lion and his [human] wife;
 the myth about the origin of death.
All three Fuegian tribes had myths about culture heroes. Yámanas have dualistic myths about the two yoalox-brothers. They act as culture heroes, and sometimes stand in an antagonistic relation to each other, introducing opposite laws. Their figures can be compared to the Selk'nam Kwanyip-brothers. In general, the presence of dualistic myths in two compared cultures does not necessarily imply relatedness or diffusion.

Some myths also feature shaman-like figures with similarities in the Yámana and Selk'nam tribes.

The abundant and nutritious patagonian blenny (Eleginops maclovinus) were apparently not consumed and the rock art suggests they may have had some religious significance.

Shamanism 

Both Selk'nam and Yámana had persons filling in shaman-like roles.
The Selk'nams believed their xon to have supernatural capabilities, e.g. to control weather and to heal. The figure of xon appeared in myths, too. The Yámana yekamush corresponds to the Selk'nam xon.

There are myths in both Yámána and Selk'nam tribes about a shaman using his power manifested as a whale. In both examples, the shaman was "dreaming" while achieving this. For example, the body of the Selk'nam xon lay undisturbed while it was believed that he travelled and achieved wonderful deeds (e.g. taking revenge on a whole group of peoples). The Yámana yekamush made similar achievements while dreaming: he killed a whale and led the dead body to arbitrary places, and transformed himself into a whale as well. In another Selk'nam myth, the xon could use his power also for transporting whale meat. He could exercise this capability from great distances and see everything that happened during the transport.

Gender 

There is a belief in both the Selk'nam and Yámana tribes that women used to rule over men in ancient times, Yámana attribute the present situation to a successful revolt of men. There are many festivals associated with this belief in both tribes.

The patrilineal Ona and the composite band society Yahgan reacted very differently to the Europeans and it has been suggested that this was due to these facets of their cultural structure.

Contacts between Yámana and Selk'nam 

The principal differences in language, habitat, and adaptation techniques did not promote contacts, although eastern Yámana groups had exchange contacts with the Selk'nam.

Language

The languages spoken by the Fuegians are all extinct, with the exception of Kawesqar. The Selk'nam language was related to the Tehuelche language and belonged to the Chon family of languages. The Onan language had more than 30,000 words.

Alternative origin speculations

Alongside the Pericúes of Baja California, the Fuegians and Patagonians show the strongest evidence of partial descent from 
the Paleoamerican lineage,
a proposed early wave of migration to the Americas derived from an Australo-Melanesian population, as opposed to the main Amerind peopling of the Americas of Siberian (admixed Ancient North Eurasian and Paleo-East Asian) descent. Further credibility is lent to this idea by research suggesting the existence of an ethnically distinct population elsewhere in South America. According to archaeologist Ricardo E. Latcham the sea-faring nomads of Patagonia (Chonos, Kawésqar, Yaghan) may be remnants from more widespread indigenous groups that were pushed south by "successive invasions" from more northern tribes.

However these previous claims were refuted by multiple genetic and anthropologic studies, such as one study published in the Nature journal in 2018 concluded that all Native Americans descended from a single founding population which initially split from East Asians at about ~36,000 BC, with geneflow between Ancestral Native Americans and Siberians persisting until ~25,000BC, before becoming isolated in the Americas at ~22,000BC. Northern and Southern Native American subpopulationes split from each other at ~17,500BC. There is also some evidence for a back-migration from the Americas into Siberia after ~11,500BC. Another study published in the Nature journal in 2021, which analysed a large amount of ancient genomes, similarly concluded that all Native Americans descended from the movement of people from Northeast Asia into the Americas. These Ancestral Americans, once south of the continental ice sheets, spread and expanded rapidly, and branched into multiple groups, which later gave rise to the major subgroups of Native American populations. The study also dismissed the existence of an hypothetical distinct non-Native American population (suggested to have been related to Indigenous Australians and Papuans), sometimes called "Paleoamerican". The authors explained that these previous claims were based on a misinterpreted genetic echo, which was revealed to represent early East-Eurasian geneflow (close but distinct to the 40,000BC old Tianyuan lineage) into Aboriginal Australians and Papuans.

Modern history 

The name "Tierra del Fuego" may refer to the fact that both Selk'nam and Yamana had their fires burn in front of their huts (or in the hut). In Magellan's time Fuegians were more numerous, and the light and smoke of their fires presented an impressive sight if seen from a ship or another island. Yamanas also used fire to send messages by smoke signals, for instance if a whale drifted ashore. The large amount of meat required notification of many people, so that it would not decay. They might also have used smoke signals on other occasions, but it is possible that Magellan saw the smokes or lights of natural phenomena.

Both Selk'nams and Yámanas were almost obliterated by diseases brought in by colonization, and probably made more vulnerable to disease by the crash of their main meat supplies (whales and seals) due to the actions of European and American fleets.

See also 
 Selk'nam genocide
 Anne Chapman
 Fuegian languages
 Indigenous Amerindian genetics
 Thomas Bridges
 Julius Popper

Notes

References 

  Title means: “North wind—south wind. Myths and tales of Fuegians”.
  Translation of the original:  Title means: “Stone of sun”; chapter means: “The land of burnt-out fires”.
  It contains the translation of the original: 
  Chapter means: “Social structure and dualistic creation myths in Siberia”; title means: “The sons of Milky Way. Studies on the belief systems of Finno-Ugric peoples”.

Further reading

External links 

Videos
 

Audio
 
 Excerpts from the same material on Amazon.com

Bibliography, linking many online documents in various languages
 Lenguas australes / Materiales sobre lenguas y culturas indígenas de la Tierra del Fuego y del sur de la Patagonia

English
 Extinct Ancient Societies Tierra del Fuegians
 Indians page of homepage of Museo Maritiomo de Ushuaia

German
 Dr Wilhelm Koppers: Unter Feuerland-Indianern. Strecker und Schröder, Stuttgart, 1924. (A whole book online. In German. Title means: “Among Fuegians”.)
 Die letzten Feuerland-Indianer / Ein Naturvolk stirbt aus. (Short article in German, with title “The last Fuegians / An indigenous people becomes extinct”)
 Feuerland — Geschichten vom Ende der Welt. (“Tierra del Fuego —  stories from the end of the world”. Link collection with small articles. In German.)
 erdrand galleries, 9 photos

Spanish
 Cosmología y chamanismo en Patagonia by Beatriz Carbonell. See abstract in English.

Shaman-like figures (Selk'nam , Yámana )
 About the Ona Indian Culture in Tierra del Fuego
 Rituals and beliefs of the Yámana, mentioning “yekamush”
  Cosmología y chamanismo en Patagonia by Beatriz Carbonell. See abstract in English.

 
Hunter-gatherers of South America